Associació Esportiva Palma de Mallorca Fútbol Sala is a futsal club based in Palma de Mallorca, city of the autonomous community of Balearic Islands.

The club was founded in 1998 and its stadium is Estadio Son Moix with capacity of 1,000 seaters.

In July 2014, the club was transferred from Manacor to Palma de Mallorca changing the club name to AE Palma Futsal and playing from 2014 to 2015 season in Palau d'Esports Son Moix.

Sponsors
 Fisiomedia – (2007–2013)
 Hospital de Llevant – (2013–2014 )
 Palma Futsal – (2014– )

Current squad

Current technical staff

Season to season

13 seasons in Primera División
9 seasons in Segunda División
1 seasons in Segunda División B
1 seasons in Tercera División

References

External links
Official website
Profile at LNFS.es

Futsal clubs in Spain
Sports teams in the Balearic Islands
Futsal clubs established in 1998
1998 establishments in Spain
Sport in Palma de Mallorca